The Jerusalem J2 is a sub-district of Jerusalem governorate of Palestine.

References 

Jerusalem Governorate